Barrow's Green is a village in Cheshire, England.

References 

Villages in Cheshire